The following is the list of the 49 stations (25 premetro stations, and 24 tram stops) of the Charleroi Metro in Belgium, and includes all stations in the Charleroi area network, as well as tram stops that are also served by premetro lines. It also includes 4 unopened stations on the unfinished line to Châtelet that will be renewed and extended.

Central loop

The "central loop" of the Charleroi Metro is grade separated (except in the vicinity of Tirou) and thus is the portion of the network that effectively operates as an almost fully metro-standards rapid transit system. There are 9 stations on the central loop, and these are served by all four Charleroi Metro lines:

Anderlues line: Lines M1 & M2

The following 10 stations (including one station that also serves the M3 line) and 6 tram stops are found on the M1 and M2 lines of the Charleroi Metro:

Gosselies line: Line M3

The following 18 tram stops and the Piges premetro station which is also served by the M1 and M2 lines are found on just the M3 line:

Gilly line: Line M4

The following 6 stations are found on the M4 line of the Charleroi Metro:

Châtelet line: Line M5: Not completed
The following 4 stations are found on the unfinished line to Châtelet. These out-of-service stations were completed in late 1980s but never opened for service. There were 4 more stations planned (construction of some of them started but did not finish) but the line has been abandoned, and the surface building of the Centennaire station was demolished in 2010s (while the underground structure still remains intact). In early 2021 a decision was made to finish and open the line (see  for more details).

See also
 List of Charleroi Metro former lines

References

 Sources for opening dates:
 
 
 

Charleroi Metro